The Mountains Are a Dream That Call to Me is a 2020 American documentary film written and directed by Cedric Cheung-Lau. The film focuses on a young Nepali traveller on the Annapurna Massif, Tukten, setting off for a new life as a laborer in Dubai, who encounters an older Australian woman who causes him to change course and discover his homeland in a new light. Producers include Alexandra Byer, Madeleine Askwith.

It had its world premiere at the 2020 Sundance Film Festival as part of the NEXT Program on January 25, 2020. It is in English and Nepali with English subtitles. It was produced by Rathaus Films. It was filmed in the Himalayas, in Nepal. It runs for 1 hour 35 minutes.

Synopsis 
The Annapurna (mountain range) in Nepal set the stage for the quiet intersection of two travelers heading in different directions. Tukten, a young Nepali man, is on his way to Dubai for new opportunities when he meets Hannah, an elderly Australian woman trekking on her own. Their encounter ends up being the momentary interruption they both didn't know they needed.

Cast 
Sanjay Lama Dong as Tukten
Alice Cummins as Hannah

Production 
The film was shot with a crew of only nine people on a 19-day trek in the Himalayas. There is very little dialogue in the film.

Critical Reception 
It has  rating on online review aggregator Rotten Tomatoes. Critics praised the vision and cinematography, as well as the natural acting of the non-professional actors. In interviews, the film's editor talked about the dream landscapes of Apichatpong Weerasethakul inspired him.

References

External links 

 
 

2020 films
American documentary films
2020 documentary films
Films set in Nepal
2020s American films